Esme Beth Morgan (born 18 October 2000) is an English professional footballer who plays as a defender for Women's Super League club Manchester City and the England women's national team.

Club career
A product of Manchester City's youth team, Morgan has spent her entire career at Manchester City which includes a loan spell at Everton for the 2019–20 season. She made her debut for the senior side in a league win against Yeovil Town on 24 September 2017

In September 2021, Morgan suffered a lower leg fracture against Tottenham at Manchester City's Academy Stadium. She has since returned to the starting line-up and made her England debut.

On 6 November 2022, Morgan captained her club for the first time in a 3-0 win over Reading.

International career 
Morgan has been featured throughout all youth levels of the England national team set-up, since she was first called up to the U-17 national team in 2017.

On 12 October 2022, Morgan won her first senior cap for the England women's national team when she made her debut as a half-time substitute in a international friendly against Czech Republic.

Personal life 
Although she grew up in Sheffield, South Yorkshire, Morgan had been a lifelong supporter of Manchester City F.C. before signing for The Blues in 2017. She says that she had a season ticket at the Blues since the age of three and "dreamed of playing for Manchester City" her whole life.

Career statistics

Club

International

Honours

Club
Manchester City
FA Women's Cup: 2019–20
Women's League Cup: 2021–22

References

External links
 Manchester City player profile
 
 Esme Morgan Profile at The FA

Living people
English women's footballers
Footballers from Sheffield
Women's association football defenders
2000 births
Women's Super League players
Manchester City W.F.C. players
Everton F.C. (women) players
England women's under-21 international footballers